Over My Head may refer to:

Songs 
 "Over My Head", a spiritual song which provides the basis for "Up Above My Head", recorded by Sister Rosetta Tharpe among others
 "Over My Head" (Fleetwood Mac song), 1975
 "Over My Head (Better Off Dead)", a 2003 song by Sum 41
 "Over My Head (Cable Car)", a 2005 song by The Fray
 "Over My Head", a song by The Aliens
 "Over My Head", a song by Asaf Avidan from Gold Shadow
 "Over My Head", a song by Brian Littrell from Welcome Home
 "Over My Head", a song by David Gray, a B-side of the single "Babylon"
 "Over My Head", a song by Furslide from Adventure
 "Over My Head", a song by Icehouse from Man of Colours
 "Over My Head", a song by King's X from Gretchen Goes to Nebraska
 "Over My Head" (Lit song), a song by Lit from the soundtrack of the film Titan A.E.
 "Over My Head", a song by Pere Ubu from The Modern Dance
 "Over My Head", a song by Powderfinger from Internationalist
 "Over My Head", a song by Ray Davies from Other People's Lives
 "Over My Head", a song by Red House Painters from Ocean Beach
 "Over My Head", a song by Richard Marx from Inside My Head
 "Over My Head", a song by Robert Calvert from Hype
 "Over My Head", a song by Semisonic from All About Chemistry
 "Over My Head" (Toni Basil song), 1983
 Over My Head (Alabama Shakes song), 2015
 "Over My Head" (Echosmith song), 2018

Other media 
 Over My Head (album), a 1994 album by Gerry Rafferty
 Over My Head (EP), a 2016 EP by Jaymay
 "Over My Head" (Haven), an episode of Haven

See also 
 Over Your Head, a home improvement reality television series